Henry Holloway (1931–1999) was an Australian rugby league footballer and coach. A national representative forward, he played club football in New South Wales and Queensland and represented both states. Holloway later coached in Brisbane.

Career

Holloway served in Japan in 1950 with the RAAF. At the end of the 1954 NSWRFL season, Holloway's first with Newtown, he played at second-row forward in their loss to South Sydney in the grand final.
During the following season, Holloway was selected to represent Australia against the touring French team, becoming Kangaroo No. 315. At the end of the 1955 NSWRFL season he again played at second-row forward in the grand final which Newtown lost to Souths by one point.

Holloway then moved north, playing with Waratah Mayfield Cheetahs in the Newcastle Rugby League in 1955 and joining the Brisbane Rugby League's Souths club. In 1959 Holloway played in the Queensland victory over New South Wales that attracted 35,261 spectators, smashing Brisbane's previous record for an interstate match of 22,817.
In 1960 he was captain-coach of Souths. He also played for the Brisbane team in the Bulimba Cup.  Holloway later captain-coached the Redcliffe club from 1963 to 1966, winning the grand final with them in 1965.

Holloway later coached the Fortitude Valley club, taking them to premiership victories in 1970 and 1974.
He coached a combined Brisbane side to the final of the 1979 Amco Cup.
During the 1970s and 1980s Holloway coached the Wynnum Manly Seagulls.

Holloway died in Brisbane, on 5 August 1999 aged 68.

References

Published sources
 

1931 births
1999 deaths
Australian rugby league coaches
Australian rugby league players
Australia national rugby league team players
Brisbane rugby league team coaches
Newtown Jets players
City New South Wales rugby league team players
Queensland rugby league team players
New South Wales rugby league team players
Souths Logan Magpies players
Redcliffe Dolphins coaches
Redcliffe Dolphins players
Rugby league players from Sydney
Wynnum Manly Seagulls coaches